Anthony Kennedy (December 21, 1810July 31, 1892) was a United States Senator from Maryland, serving from 1857 to 1863. He was the brother of United States Secretary of the Navy John P. Kennedy.

Early life
Kennedy was born in Baltimore, Maryland, to merchant John Kennedy (1769–1836) and Anne Clayton (née Pendleton) Kennedy (1776–1854). His parents sent him to Charles Town, Virginia, (now West Virginia) in 1821, where he attended the Jefferson Academy.

Career
He studied law and also engaged in agricultural pursuits.  He was a member of the Virginia House of Delegates from 1839 to 1843 and a magistrate on the bench of the Jefferson County Court in Virginia for ten years.

Kennedy was an unsuccessful Whig candidate for election in 1844 to the Twenty-ninth Congress and declined the offer of President Millard Fillmore to be consul to Havana, Cuba, in 1850.  He returned to Baltimore in 1851 and was elected as a member of the Maryland House of Delegates in 1856.

Kennedy was elected by the American Party to the United States Senate and served from 1857 to 1863.  He served as a delegate to the State constitutional convention in 1867, afterwards retiring from active political life.

Personal life
On 1832, Kennedy was married to Sarah Stephena Dandridge (1811–1846). They lived on his farm near Ellicott City, Maryland. Together, they were the parents of three children:

 Stephen Dandridge Kennedy (1834–1914), who married Frances Howell, a daughter of Lewis Howell and Margaret (née Armistead) Howell, in 1863. After her death, he married his cousin Mary Selden, a daughter of John D. Selden and Ann Rebecca (née Kennedy) Selden, in 1869.
 Philip Pendleton Kennedy, who died young.
 Agnes Spottiswoode Kennedy (1838–1907), who married Hall Harrison, a son of Rev. Hugh Thompson Harrison, in 1876.

Kennedy died in Annapolis, Maryland on July 31, 1892. He is interred in Greenmount Cemetery in Baltimore, Maryland.

Descendants
Through his son Stephen's first marriage, he was the grandfather of Frances Howell Hughes Kennedy, who married William Maurice Manly. From his son Stephen's second marriage, he was a grandfather of four more, including Anthony Kennedy (b. 1873),  Mary (née Kennedy) Page (1875–1936), Margaret Hughes (née Kennedy) Cox (1877–1934), Agnes Gray (née Kennedy) Mason (1881–1960).

References

External links

1810 births
1892 deaths
Politicians from Baltimore
American people of Irish descent
Maryland Know Nothings
Maryland Whigs
Know-Nothing United States senators from Maryland
Unionist Party United States senators from Maryland
Members of the Virginia House of Delegates
Members of the Maryland House of Delegates
People from Ellicott City, Maryland
People of Maryland in the American Civil War
Burials at Green Mount Cemetery